Julian M. Dobbs (born 1968) is a New Zealand-born American bishop. He serves as the Diocesan bishop of the Anglican Diocese of the Living Word (ADLW), a jurisdiction of the Anglican Church in North America. Dobbs' ministry as a bishop includes overseeing congregations and clergy of the diocese. He became a naturalized citizen of the United States on February 7, 2014.

Early career
Dobbs was born and raised in New Zealand, where he married his wife, Brenda, they have three children. Son Sam is married to Paige Dossett. Daughter Grace is married to Lt. Commander David Welborn and Frances who lives in Virginia.  He and his wife have two grandchildren. In 1991, he was ordained in the Anglican Church in New Zealand. He has an L.Th., Th.M. and a D.D. He planted three congregations, led the fastest-growing congregation in New Zealand and hosted a weekly hour-long television show in Nelson.

In 2004, Dobbs became executive director of the Barnabas Fund, promoting awareness of the persecution of Christians around the world, particularly in Laos, Malaysia, Syria, Egypt and North Korea.  In the aftermath of the Indian Ocean tsunami, Dobbs' relief work in Aceh, Indonesia, was recognised by the New Zealand government with the New Zealand Special Service Medal. In 2006, Dobbs and his family relocated to the Washington, D.C. area where he continued to work at the Barnabas Fund.

CANA ministry
In 2008, Dobbs was appointed archdeacon and canon missioner in the Convocation of Anglicans in North America, where he contributed to clergy development, worked to help North American Anglicans understand and the challenges posed by the rise of Islam in Africa, and develop a West African-American clergy and lay mission partnership. To continue this and other gospel work, he was elected a bishop for CANA and the Church of Nigeria in spring of 2011, and consecrated by Nicholas Okoh in Lagos on September 25, 2011. He was also elected and received as a member of the College of Bishop of ACNA at the same time during a bishops meeting in Long Beach, California.  Dobbs has been active in opposing and publicizing the Boko Haram attacks on Christians in northern Nigeria and calling for international prayer and action. In August 2012, Okoh visited Washington, D.C., and through Dobbs' connections met with policymakers and officials to promote action against the Muslim militants in the north. He served on ACNA's task force on Christian-Muslim relations.

On May 7, 2013, in Wayne, Pennsylvania, Dobbs became the first bishop of the newly formed Missionary Diocese of CANA East. CANA East stretches from Maine to Miami and from Tulsa, OK and The bronx, NY.  The diocese (now the Anglican Diocese of the Living Word) has 42 congregations and over 115 clergy.  When it was created, the diocese was one of the three dioceses formed out of The Convocation of Anglicans in North America.  It is also a diocese of the ACNA.

Dobbs attended the GAFCON 2 meeting in Nairobi Kenya in 2013 and serves as a member of the International Board of Barnabas Fund, an organization that supports suffering Christians.

In 2013 Dobbs wrote an open letter to the President of the United States, Barack Obama, calling for urgent intervention in support of persecuted Christians in Syria.

In January 2014, Dobbs was appointed as the Missionary Bishop of CANA by the Most Rev. Nicholas D. Okoh, Primate of all Nigeria.   he remained diocesan bishop while taking on the additional responsibilities of providing oversight and leadership to CANA's overall ministry.

Dobbs wrote his first pastoral letter to CANA on January 24, 2014. In September 2014, Dobbs spoke at the "In Defense of Christians" forum in Washington, D.C. Hundreds of activists, including Christian clergy from across the Middle East and more than a dozen members of Congress attended a three-day conference aimed at training a serious policy-impacting force in Washington to protect persecuted Christians overseas. Dobbs presented a paper entitled "Why Christianity is Vital To the Middle East". He said: "Christianity is intrinsically linked to the Middle East. It is in the Middle East that Christianity was birthed in the backwaters of the Roman Empire and from where the message of the Christian gospel spread throughout the Roman Empire, to Ethiopia, and to the Persian Empire."

As missionary bishop, Dobbs presided over the 10th anniversary of the founding of CANA. In his anniversary address, Dobbs said, "CANA was missionary then and she is missionary now. As a Convocation we exist not only as a jurisdiction for the 120 congregations and 450 clergy and chaplains who serve as members of our Convocation, we exist as a missionary movement called by Almighty God to replant biblical missionary Anglican Christianity across North America. This is the mission to which we in CANA have all been called by Almighty God."

Living Through the Word
In 2019, Bishop Dobbs became the main host of Living Through the Word podcast. In the inaugural episode Bishop Dobbs interviewed his mentor, Bishop Martyn Minns.

Anglican Diocese of the Living Word 

Dobbs is the diocesan bishop of the Anglican Diocese of the Living Word (formerly CANA East).  He oversees the ministry of the diocese across 19 States with mission in Ghana and Haiti.  three bishops serve with Dobbs,  Bishop William Love, Bishop David Bena and Bishop Dan Herzog.  Dobbs remains committed to the gospel once for all entrusted to the saints, the planting of new congregations, Christian discipleship and engaging the world with the good news of Jesus and sharing the gospel of jesus.

He was referred to as the 'based bishop' in 2022 by author and journalist, Rod Dreher.  Dreher wrote, "I’ve been this week at the conference of the Anglican Diocese of the Living Word (ACNA), led by Bishop Julian Dobbs. The bishop gave his annual address on Friday morning, and … Lord have mercy, if only ten percent of bishops and pastors talked like this man, we would be living in a different country."

In that address Bishop Dobbs said, "Courage is not something that regularly appears in the conversation and discipline of many North America Christians. With respect, being a Christian in North America today does not always require a whole lot of courage. But brothers and sisters, as the clouds around our nation begin to gather and the powers of darkness extend their influence, we the followers of Jesus Christ in this generation must ready ourselves to act, where necessary, with courage."

Personal Life 
Bishop Dobbs has resided in Virginia.

References

External links
Anglican Diocese of the Living Word | Welcome

|-

1967 births
Living people
New Zealand Anglican priests
Bishops of the Anglican Church in North America
21st-century Anglican bishops in the United States
Naturalized citizens of the United States
New Zealand emigrants to the United States
Anglican realignment people